The Campus Biotech is a Swiss institution hosting research institutes and biotechnology companies. The Campus Biotech is located in the former Merck Serono building, in Geneva (Switzerland).

The Campus Biotech is a part of the Swiss Innovation Park.

History
End of June 2013, Merck Serono left its headquarters in Geneva and the building was bought by Ernesto Bertarelli and Hansjörg Wyss (for more than 300 million Swiss francs) to create the Campus Biotech.

Structure
 EPFL-UNIGE Biomedical Center (14000 m2)
 Center for Neuroprosthetics (EPFL)
 Human Brain Project and Blue Brain Project (EPFL) (5000 m2)
 Wyss Center for Bio and Neuroengineering (8000 m2)
 Foundation for Innovative New Diagnostics (FIND)
 Biotech Innovation Square (12000 m2)
 Health 2030 Genome Center

See also
 Lausanne campus

Notes and references

External links
 

Buildings and structures in Geneva
Engineering research institutes
Biotechnology in Switzerland
Laboratories in Switzerland
Research institutes in Switzerland
Multidisciplinary research institutes